The Calaveras River is a river in the  San Joaquin Valley of California.

The Spanish word calaveras means "skulls." The river was said to have been named by Spanish explorer Gabriel Moraga in 1806 when he found many skulls of Native Americans along its banks. He believed they had either died of famine or been killed in tribal conflicts over hunting and fishing grounds.

Later, human remains were of the native Miwuk people killed by Spanish soldiers after they banded together to rise against Spanish missionaries. The Stanislaus River is named for Estanislau, a coastal Miwuk who escaped from Mission San Jose in the late 1830s. He is reported to have raised a small group of men with crude weapons, hiding in the foothills when the Spanish attacked. The Miwuk were quickly decimated by Spanish gunfire.

In 1836, John Marsh, Jose Noriega, and a party of men, went exploring in Northern California.  They made camp along a river bed in the evening, and when they woke up the next morning, discovered that they had camped in the midst of a great quantity of skulls and bones.  They also gave the river the appropriate name: Calaveras.

New Hogan Lake is the only lake on the river. It is formed by New Hogan Dam, which was completed in 1963. The dam was built by the United States Army Corps of Engineers, primarily for flood control. The dam also provides drinking water, water for irrigation, hydroelectricity and recreation, including fishing, camping, swimming and water skiing.

The Mormon Slough, a distributary of the Calaveras, splits away about five miles east of Linden, California. In east Stockton, the Stockton Diverting Canal reconnects the Mormon Slough and the Calaveras. Downstream from this flood control channel, the often dry Mormon Slough continues on its southerly path, through downtown, to the Stockton Channel. The Calaveras makes a northerly arc, passing through farmland, orchards, and the University of the Pacific Stockton Campus, then alongside its namesake Brookside district, before flowing into the Deepwater Channel about three miles downriver from the Mormon Slough. Thus much of central Stockton, being completely surrounded by these waterways, is itself one of the many river islands which make up the San Joaquin Delta.

References

External links
United States Army Corps of Engineers - New Hogan Lake
Columbia Gazetteer of North America
Friends of the Lower Calaveras River
Calaveras River Watershed Stewardship Group
Calaveras River Water Quality Study

Rivers of Calaveras County, California
Tributaries of the San Joaquin River
Geography of the San Joaquin Valley
Rivers of Northern California